Formica subaenescens is a species of ant in the family Formicidae. It is found in North America.

References

Further reading

 

subaenescens
Articles created by Qbugbot
Insects described in 1893